The 2004 Tour de la Région Wallonne was the 31st edition of the Tour de Wallonie cycle race and was held from 26 July to 30 July 2004. The race started in Aubel and finished in Charleroi. The race was won by Gerben Löwik.

General classification

References

Tour de Wallonie
Tour de la Région Wallonne